Frontier Communications of the Southwest Inc. is a Frontier Communications operating company providing local telephone services to former Verizon California territory in Arizona, California, and Nevada. The company was created as a subsidiary of New Communications ILEC Holdings by Verizon in 2009 and sold on July 1, 2010 to Frontier.

The predecessors of Frontier Communications of the Southwest were two rural telephone companies: Parker Valley Telephone of Parker, Arizona and United Farmers Telephone of Gardnerville, Nevada. Contel acquired Parker Valley Telephone in 1964 United Farmers Telephone of Gardnerville merged with Interstate Telegraph in 1949. California Interstate Telephone acquired Interstate Telegraph in 1954. Contel acquired California Interstate Telephone in 1965. Both became part of Contel of California. Contel of California was merged into GTE California (later Verizon California) in 1993.

The exchanges operated by Frontier Communications of the Southwest are:
 California: Alpine, Coleville, Earp/Big River, Havasu Landing, Parker Dam, Blythe, and Palo Verde
 Arizona: Cibola, Ehrenberg, Bouse, Parker, Parker Dam, and Poston.
 Nevada/California: Gardnerville, Gardnerville Ranchos, Glenbrook, Jacks Valley, Montgomery Pass, Smith Valley, Stateline, Sweetwater, Topaz Lake, and Yerington.

References

Frontier Communications
Communications in California
Communications in Arizona
Communications in Nevada
Telecommunications companies of the United States
Companies based in Sacramento County, California
Elk Grove, California
Telecommunications companies established in 2009
2009 establishments in California
Verizon Communications
American companies established in 2009